Newcomer is an unincorporated community in Chariton County, in the U.S. state of Missouri.

History
A post office called Newcomer was established in 1886, and remained in operation until 1906. W. F. Newcomer, an early postmaster, most likely gave the community his last name.

References

Unincorporated communities in Chariton County, Missouri
Unincorporated communities in Missouri